Lonwabo Nicholus 'Foxy' Ntleki (born 7 August 1992) is a South African rugby union player, who played for the  in 2012 and 2013. His regular position is centre.

Ntleki then returned to the Eastern Cape, joining  in 2012. He was in their 2012 Vodacom Cup squad and appeared on the bench in the game against . He made his debut against  in the 2012 Currie Cup First Division. He made a total of four appearances for the Kings before being released at the end of the 2014 season.

References

South African rugby union players
Eastern Province Elephants players
Living people
1992 births
Border Bulldogs players
Rugby union centres
Rugby union players from the Eastern Cape